Demetrios "Jim" Lefkos is a retired Cypriot football (soccer) forward. He played professionally in the North American Soccer League and American Soccer League, where he led the league in scoring in 1969.

Player
A native of Cyprus, Lefkos attended the University of Toronto where he played on the school's soccer team from 1964 to 1969. Lefkos led the team in scoring for three consecutive seasons during which the Varsity Blues won three OQAA championships.  He was inducted into the school's Hall of Fame in 1999. In 1963, he played in the National Soccer League with Toronto Hakoah. He contributed a hattrick which secured the NSL Championship for Hakoah against Toronto Ukraina in the 1965 season. In 1966, he played with league rivals Toronto Hellas. He re-signed with Toronto for the 1967 NSL season.

In 1969, Lefkos signed with the Syracuse Scorpions of the American Soccer League.  Lefkos led the league in scoring and was a First Team All Star.  In 1970, he moved to the Rochester Lancers of the North American Soccer League.  In 1971, he began the season in Rochester before being traded to the Toronto Metros. In late July, 1971 he was traded to former club Toronto Hellas for Panos Polyviou.

Coach
Lefkos then became a physical education and health teacher as well as the boys' soccer coach at Danforth Collegiate and Technical Institute. In 1981, Lefkos, in addition to his high school responsibilities, became the head soccer coach of the University of Toronto men's soccer team.  He coached the team to one national championship before retiring in 2002.

References

External links
 NASL stats

Living people
Cypriot footballers
Canadian soccer coaches
American Soccer League (1933–1983) players
North American Soccer League (1968–1984) players
Rochester Lancers (1967–1980) players
Syracuse Scorpions players
Toronto Blizzard (1971–1984) players
Association football forwards
Year of birth missing (living people)
Toronto Varsity Blues soccer players
Canadian National Soccer League players